Stanislaw Jerzy Bolesławski (born 25 February 1940) is a Polish politician. He was the mayor of Warsaw, and the voivode of Warsaw Voivodeship from 1986 to 1990. Bolesławski was born in Przemyśl.

References

External links
 2003 archived copy of Bolesławski's profile (originally published on the official website of Warsaw, the capital of Poland) (

1940 births
Living people
People from Przemyśl
Mayors of Warsaw